All Jharkhand Students Union or AJSU PARTY is a state political party of Jharkhand state, India. AJSU PARTY was founded on June 22, 1986, modelled after All Assam Students Union. The founders of AJSU were disillusioned with the previous political parties of Jharkhand and wanted more militant agitations.

AJSU organized general strikes and a campaign to boycott the Lok Sabha elections in 1989. By 1990 however, AJSU had taken a more pragmatic line and had candidates for the Bihar state assembly election on the Jharkhand Mukti Morcha symbol. Today, AJSU contests elections under its own name.

In the 2004 Lok Sabha elections AJSU was allied with the Bharatiya Janata Party. Ahead of the Jharkhand Legislative Assembly election, 2005, AJSU broke with the BJP-led NDA and formed an alliance with Lok Janshakti Party.

Ahead of the 2014 Jharkhand Legislative Assembly election, AJSU again allied with the BJP-led NDA. As results announced, AJSU won 5 seats while BJP won 37 seats in the state assembly securing the majority. AJSU party president Sudesh Mahto lost from his constituency Silli after representing it for nearly 15 years.

Electoral Performance

Lok Sabha Elections

Vidhan Sabha Elections

References

 
1986 establishments in Bihar
Political parties established in 1986
State political parties in Jharkhand